Astra 1H is one of the Astra communications satellites owned and operated by SES.

History 
SES ordered its Hughes 601HP satellite, in 1995 for Astra 1H.

Launch 
Astra-1H was launched on 18 June 1999 at 01:49:30 UTC, by a Proton-K / DM-2M launch vehicle, from Site 81/23 at the Baikonur Cosmodrome in Kazakhstan. It was maneuvered into a geostationary orbit at 19.2° East of longitude.

References 

Astra satellites
Satellites of Luxembourg
Spacecraft launched in 1999
1999 in spaceflight
1999 in Luxembourg
Satellites using the BSS-601 bus